Memoria Apostolorum, which means (in) memory of the apostles, is one of the lost texts from the New Testament apocrypha.

Given the name, it may be one of the texts which are already known, and for which we have some of the content, such as the Gospel of the Twelve, or one of the apocryphal Acts, or Apocalypses.

Lost apocrypha